Samuel Ratcliffe may refer to:

 Samuel D. Ratcliffe (1945–1995), screenwriter for daytime television
 Samuel Kerkham Ratcliffe (1868–1958), English journalist and lecturer